Al-Ittihad Sport Club, is an Iraqi football team based in Al-Ashar, Basra, that plays in Iraq Division Three.

History

Foundation and early years
Al-Ittihad was founded in 1937 in the Al-Bachhari district, and it was the first administrative body headed by Nadhum Majeed. In 1940, Tawfiq Al-Ainachi assumed the presidency of the club, and the club’s activity stopped at the outbreak of the World War II, and in 1945 the club resumed its activity, and it moved to a new location in the Al-Saee district. In the 1940s, the club was receiving direct support from Prince Abd al-Ilah. Prince Abd al-Ilah's encouragement was the first motive for the club's activity, as he visited Basra on every occasion, he came to the stadium to enjoy one of the football matches that the club was running. He also donated a silver cup to the football club bearing his name in 1947, and on April 22, 1949 the prince spent an entire day in the club's hospitality to supervise himself the activities of the club teams, and the club's name was changed to the Royal Al-Ittihad Sport Club. At the end of the 1940s and the beginning of the 1950s, the president of the club was Sami Al-Hilali, who issued the first sports newspaper in Basra in September 1950 under the name of Al-Ittihad Sports Newspaper, he was an influential figure, and at that time he was communicating with club administrations in neighboring countries to conduct friendly matches and hold sporting events.

In FA Basra League
Al-Ittihad has participated in the Iraq FA Basra League (the top division) since its inception in 1948. The 1949–50 season was the second season of  League  organised by the Basra branch of the Iraq Football Association. The tournament began on 19 October 1949, and the regular season ended in November 1949 with Sharikat Naft Al-Basra and Al-Ittihad qualifying for the final. Al-Ittihad lost 5-1 in the final and took second place.

In Premier League
Al-Ittihad played in the Iraqi Premier League for the first time in its history in the 1976–77 season, and it came in sixth place as its best position in the history of the tournament, as it played 11 matches, winning 4, drawing 3 and losing 4 of them, and the team's player Abbas Fadhel won the league's top scorer title with six goals, in conjunction with four other players. In the 1977–78 season, the team finished the league in 11th place, as it played 13 matches, won 3, drew 3, and lost 7 of them. In the 1978–79 season, the team fell to the bottom of the league standings, after playing 22 matches, winning only one match, drawing 2 and losing 19 of them, and relegated to the Iraq Division One. The club played in Iraq Division one and won this championship in 1980–81 season and promoted in the Iraqi Premier League again and played in 1981–82 season.

Famous players
 Karim Allawi
 Mejbil Jwayed
 Hassan Ali Funjan
 Rahim Bakr
 Abdul Karim Jassim

Honours

National
Iraq Division One (second tier)
Winners (2): 1975–76, 1980–81

Regional
Iraq FA Basra League (top tier)
Runners-up (1): 1949–50

President assassination
On January 18, 2005, unidentified armed persons assassinated the club's president, Alaa Hamid Nasih in Basra, and then escaped without being arrested.

Al-Ittihad Women
Al-Ittihad Club is the first club in Basra that was concerned with the women's sports movement. In 1957, the first woman was elected as a member of the administrative board of the club, Saadiya Abdul Wahed Al-Farhan. Mondays were designated for women to engage in sports activities, and this led to the formation of women's teams, so that The women's athletics team participated in the national championship in 1975.

References

External links
 Al-Ittihad SC on Goalzz.com
 Iraq Clubs- Foundation Dates
 Basra Clubs Union
 Hanna Al-Sheikh Cup

Football clubs in Iraq
Association football clubs established in 1937
Football clubs in Basra
Basra